No Light is the second extended play released by New Zealand band The Naked and Famous. It was released on 8 September 2008.

Critical reception
Stuff described No Light as "yet another confident statement of intent from an up-and-coming Kiwi band that deserves all the hype it's getting".

Track listing

Personnel 
Credits adapted from the liner notes of No Light.

Visuals and imagery
 Joel Kefali – art, design
 Campbell Hooper – art, design
 Troy Photography – photography
 Special Problems – photography

Instruments
 Ben Knapp – bass (tracks: 1–3, 5)
 Jordan Clark – live drums (tracks: 2–4)

Technical and production
 Aaron Short – engineering, mixing, production
 Thom Powers – engineering, mixing, production
 Ben Knapp – engineering elements (tracks: 1–5)
 Angus McNaughton – mastering

Release history

References

2008 EPs
Alternative rock EPs
The Naked and Famous albums